Duško Petković (born 24 July 1990) is a Serbian football midfielder, who plays for FK Prva iskra Barič.

Club career
Petković started his career playing with BPI Slavija. Later he spent some period with Columbia Floridsdorf and SV Langenrohr in Austria. Returning in Serbia, Petković joined Šumadija Jagnjilo, where he played in 2012 and 2013, and he was also with Sinđelić Beograd in the meantime. Petković moved to Žarkovo in 2014, where he stayed until 2016. In summer 2016, Petković signed with Serbian SuperLiga side Rad.

References

External links
 

1990 births
Living people
People from Suva Reka
Association football midfielders
Serbian footballers
FK Sinđelić Beograd players
FK Rad players
OFK Žarkovo players
Serbian SuperLiga players
Serbian First League players
Serbian expatriate footballers
Serbian expatriate sportspeople in Austria
Expatriate footballers in Austria